John Gray is an American writer, director, producer. He is the creator of the CBS television series Ghost Whisperer starring Jennifer Love Hewitt.  He has written and directed feature movies as well.

Gray has written and directed many movies for television, such as the remake of the 1976 telefilm Helter Skelter, Martin and Lewis, The Hunley, The Day Lincoln Was Shot, and several Hallmark Hall of Fame movies.

He directed the ABC original series Empire.

Filmography

Film

Television 
The numbers in directing and writing credits refer to the number of episodes.

External links
 
 "Going Really Indie, With His Own Cash" The New York Times, January 22, 2010

American film directors
American film producers
American male screenwriters
American television directors
American male television writers
Living people
Ghost Whisperer
1958 births